Alcée Louis la Branche (1806 – August 17, 1861) was an American politician who served as a member of the U.S. House of Representatives from the state of Louisiana. He served one term as a Democrat from 1843 to 1845.

Biography
La Branche was born near New Orleans, the son of Alexandre La Branche (a Revolutionary War regimental commander whose family had emigrated to Louisiana from Bavaria and had changed its surname from the German "Zweig" to the French "Branche," with both names meaning "branch") and Marie Jeanne Piseros (whose family was of Spanish ancestry).  La Branche attended the Université de Sorèze in Sorèze (France).

Political career 
He served as Speaker of the House of the Louisiana State House of Representatives in 1833 and later served as Chargé d'Affaires to the Republic of Texas.  He served in Congress from 1843 until 1845.

Death 
He died in Hot Springs, Virginia.

Slavery

La Branche was a slaveholder.

See also 
List of Hispanic and Latino Americans in the United States Congress

References

External links 
Bio at Congress.gov
Political Graveyard
Bio at Handbook of Texas Online
La Branche at the Office of the Historian

 
 
 

1806 births
1861 deaths
American people of Spanish descent
Democratic Party members of the Louisiana House of Representatives
Speakers of the Louisiana House of Representatives
American people of German descent
Louisiana Creole people of Spanish descent
Hispanic and Latino American members of the United States Congress
Ambassadors of the United States to the Republic of Texas
Democratic Party members of the United States House of Representatives from Louisiana
19th-century American diplomats
19th-century American politicians